

Hermann Schulte-Heuthaus (15 January 1898 – 28 December 1979) was a German general during World War II. He was a recipient of the Knight's Cross of the Iron Cross of Nazi Germany.

Awards and decorations

 Knight's Cross of the Iron Cross on 23 January 1942 as Oberstleutnant and commander of Kradschützen-Bataillon 25

References

Citations

Bibliography

 

1898 births
1979 deaths
Major generals of the German Army (Wehrmacht)
People from East Prussia
German Army personnel of World War I
Prussian Army personnel
Recipients of the clasp to the Iron Cross, 1st class
Recipients of the Knight's Cross of the Iron Cross
German prisoners of war in World War II
German Army generals of World War II